The following is a list of notable tennis stadiums by capacity, that is the maximum number of spectators they can regularly accommodate.

Notes:
 Stadiums ordered by their capacity (if equal, by the first stadium to reach the capacity)
 Some of the tennis venues like the O2 Arena and Rotterdam Ahoy, are, from the outset, general or multi-purpose arenas
 The larger (mostly Association football) stadiums that incidentally may have hosted a tennis event are listed in the last section.

Current tennis stadiums

ATP/WTA/Grandslam tour tennis venues

Davis Cup and Federation Cup venues
Below is a list of, arenas, stadiums, and courts that have held a World Group match in either the Davis Cup or the Fed Cup (including world group playoffs), but that have not appeared on either the ATP or WTA tours.

Former tennis venues
This is list of stadiums that no longer host regular professional tennis tournaments in the men's or women's tour (ATP/WTA), but have done so in the past.

Other tennis events

See also

List of tennis venues
List of stadiums by capacity
List of American football stadiums by capacity
List of football (soccer) stadiums by capacity

References

Tennis venues
Stadiums
Stadiums
Lists of stadiums
Lists of sports venues with capacity